518th may refer to:

518th Air Defense Group, disbanded United States Air Force organization
518th Fighter-Interceptor Squadron, inactive United States Air Force unit
518th Infantry Regiment (United States), Infantry regiment in the Army Reserve

See also
518 (number)
518, the year 518 (DXVIII) of the Julian calendar
518 BC